Cavalcanti is an Italian surname, used by people of ancient Italian origin. In Italy and Brazil mostly in the northeast states of Pernambuco and Paraiba.
The variant Cavalcante is also used. The family came to northeast Brazil in 1560.
 Alberto Cavalcanti (1897–1982), Brazilian film director
 Andrea Cavalcanti, a fictional character in The Count of Monte Cristo by Alexandre Dumas
 Cavalcante de' Cavalcanti (died c. 1280), Florentine philosopher, father of Guido Cavalicanti
 Emiliano Di Cavalcanti (1897–1976), Brazilian painter
 Giovanni Cavalcanti (chronicler) (1381–), Florentine chronicler
 Giovanni Cavalcanti (poet) (1444–1509), Florentine poet
 Guido Cavalcanti (–1300), Italian poet
 Humberto Cavalcanti de Albuquerque Teixeira (1915–1979), Brazilian lawyer, politician, musician, and composer
 João Pessoa Cavalcanti de Albuquerque (1878–1930), Brazilian politician
 Joaquim Arcoverde de Albuquerque Cavalcanti (1850–1930), first Latin American Cardinal
 Severino Cavalcanti (1930–2020), Brazilian politician

See also
 Cavalcanti, Rio de Janeiro, a neighborhood in Rio de Janeiro

References

 
Italian-language surnames